The Kingsmen Volume 3 is the third album by the rock band the Kingsmen, released in 1965.

Release and reception

The Kingsmen's third album featured "The Jolly Green Giant", a novelty number which reached #4 on the Billboard Hot 100 pop chart and #25 on the Billboard R&B chart, along with several other R&B classics and a couple of Wailers covers.  As with previous albums, crowd noise overdubs were added on some tracks to simulate a live performance.  The album sold well due to the success of "The Jolly Green Giant", the group's frenetic touring schedule, and the ongoing controversy over the lyrics of "Louie Louie".  It entered the Billboard Top LPs chart on February 20, 1965, and remained for 18 weeks, peaking at No. 22.

The February 27, 1965 issue of Billboard Magazine reviewed the album:
The boys are in the pop music forefront again with their hit single, "Jolly Green Giant." This their third album contains the gutsy, earthy delivery that has marked their past hits ("Louie Louie") and the new single. To add to the excitement, Wand has dubbed in audience crowd noises.

The LP was released in the U.S. in mono (WDM 662) and stereo (WDS 662) versions, and also released in Canada (Reo 676) and Taiwan (First FL-1305, orange vinyl, titled Hello! The Kingsmen). The album was not released in the UK. In 1993 Sundazed and Bear Family reissued the album on CD with bonus tracks "Since You Been Gone", "It's Only The Dog" and "The Wolf Of Manhattan", and without crowd noise overdubs.  The CD also moved "The Jolly Green Giant" from track 1 to track 3.

Early LP pressings omitted bassist Norm Sundholm from the sleeve notes.  The title on the labels was "Vol. III" vs. "Volume 3" elsewhere.  The Canadian release had a yellow sticker at the top of the cover with "Featuring Jolly Green Giant", the Kingsmen single that reached #1 on the Canadian charts.

Track listing
 Over You – 2:05 (Lynn Easton)
 That's Cool, That's Trash – 2:12 (P.F. Sloan, Steve Barri)
 The Jolly Green Giant – 1:57 (L. Easton, Don Harris, Dewey Terry)
 Don't You Just Know It – 2:55 (Huey "Piano" Smith, Johnny Vincent)
 I'll Go Crazy – 1:52 (Lee Allman)
 La-Do-Dada – 2:40 (Dale Hawkins, Margaret Lewis)
 Long Green – 2:37 (Lynn Easton)
 Mother In Law – 2:32 (Allen Toussaint)
 Shout – 2:24 (Ronald Isley, Rudolph Isley, O'Kelly Isley)
 Searchin' For Love – 2:06 (Wayne Gust)
 Tall Cool One – 2:35  (Rick Dangel, Kent Morrill, John Greek)
 Comin' Home Baby – 2:23 (Ben Tucker, Bob Dorough)
 Since You Been Gone† – 3:08 (Rick Dangel, John (Buck) Ormsby, Kent Morrill)
 It's Only The Dog† – 2:13 (Artie Wayne, Hugh McCracken)
 The Wolf Of Manhattan† – 2:32 (Joey Levine, Arthur Resnick)

† CD bonus tracks

Note:  Track times are from the Sundazed reissue CD and differ in some cases from listings on the original Wand LP.

The 8-track release (Wand 92-662) divided the track list into four programs and altered the track order to 3-7-12, 1-2-4, 5-6-11, 8-9-10.

Chart positions

Musicians and production
Lynn Easton: vocals, saxophone
Mike Mitchell: guitar, vocals
Barry Curtis: keyboards, vocals
Dick Peterson: drums, vocals
Norm Sundholm: bass, vocals
Producer:  All tracks produced by Jerry Dennon for Jerden Productions except "The Wolf of Manhattan" produced by Paul Tannen
Arranger:  The Kingsmen
Engineer:  Kearney Barton
Studio:  Audio Recording, Inc., Seattle, Washington
Album design:  Mitchell-Morrison, Inc.
CD booklet layout:  Jeff Smith

References

1965 albums
The Kingsmen albums